The Alex Theatre is a landmark located at 216 North Brand Boulevard in Glendale, California, United States. It is currently owned by the city of Glendale and operated by SAS. The theater’s capacity is 1,400.

Architecture
The Alex Theatre originally opened in 1925 as the Alexander Theatre, and was designed by architects Arthur G. Lindley and Charles R. Selkirk  Associates, although at least one written source attributes it to the architectural firm of Meyer & Holler. Lindley & Selkirk Associates also designed the Hotel Glendale. The unique interior has distinct neo-classic Greek and Egyptian architectural elements, similar to the Greco-Egyptian period of Ptolemaic Egypt. A long walkway and courtyard separating the ticket booth from the lobby was inspired after the famous Grauman's Egyptian Theatre in Hollywood.

In 1940, notable theater architect S. Charles Lee was commissioned to redesign the exterior of the Alexander. Lee's portfolio included the Tower Theatre and the Los Angeles Theatre, both in Downtown Los Angeles, the Academy Theatre in Inglewood, as well as the Tujunga Theatre in Tujunga. His contributions included a  art-deco column with neon lights, topped by a spiked, neon sphere that gave it a starburst appearance. A neon, angled marquee emblazoned the theater's new name, the Alex, which was shortened to fit the larger letters. At this time the two-story retail and office building on the south half of the forecourt lot was demolished.

History

The Alexander officially opened its doors on September 4, 1925. It was operated by the West Coast-Langley Theatre Circuit and featured vaudeville performances, plays and silent movies on a single screen. It was named after Alexander Langley, the son of Claude L. Langley, owner of the West Coast chain that included the Raymond Theater in Pasadena, and the Orange Theatre in the city of Orange. In addition to the lavish architecture, a huge Wurlitzer pipe organ was installed. A regular organist supplied improvised accompaniment during the silent picture era.

Located only a few miles from Walt Disney's Hyperion studio, the theater was Disney's favorite place to preview his cartoons to see how they would play to audiences. Several movies had their preview screening at The Alex, inviting celebrities such as Alice Faye, Don Ameche, Elizabeth Taylor for National Velvet and Bing Crosby for Going My Way (both 1944). A backstage fire on August 23, 1948 caused $150,000 in damages.

Starting in the 1950s, the Alex showed blockbuster films such as Ben-Hur (1959) and Indiana Jones and the Temple of Doom (1984). A wide aspect ratio screen was installed in 1954, to accommodate the new CinemaScope pictures, along with a surround sound system. 
The Alex underwent an extensive renovation in 1993, which restored much of the original wall-painting and decorations, as well as the neon spire added by S. Charles Lee.

The Alex today 

The Alex Theatre Performing Arts and Entertainment Center has been the centerpiece of Glendale's arts, culture and community events since it originally opened. It is managed by Glendale Arts, anon-profit organization. The theater's diverse schedule boasts roughly 250 events per year and attracts more than 100,000 patrons annually. Programs range from classical and contemporary concerts, theatre, dance, comedy, fundraising and special events as well as TV and film productions and industry related award presentations. The Alex was the venue in 2017 for the finale of RuPaul's Drag Race (season 9). And in the summer of 2019, the NBC comedy competition series Bring the Funny used the Alex Theatre as the venue for the final two episodes of its first season.

Resident companies include the Alex Film Society, Glendale Youth Orchestra, Musical Theatre Guild, and the Los Angeles Chamber Orchestra

See also
 Glendale Register of Historic Resources and Historic Districts
 List of National Historic Landmarks by state
 List of threatened historic sites in the United States
 History of the National Register of Historic Places

External links 

 The Alex Theatre online 
 The Alex Film Society

References

Cinemas and movie theaters in Los Angeles County, California
Buildings and structures in Glendale, California
Theatres in Los Angeles County, California
Concert halls in California
Music venues in Los Angeles
Towers in California
Cinema of Southern California
Buildings and structures on the National Register of Historic Places in Los Angeles County, California
National Register of Historic Places in the San Fernando Valley
Theatres on the National Register of Historic Places in California
Theatres completed in 1925
1925 establishments in California
Tourist attractions in Glendale, California
Art Deco architecture in California
1925 establishments in the United States